Swissôtel Hotels & Resorts, commonly known as Swissôtel, is a Swiss chain of luxury hotels which operates 37 properties in 17 countries. The chain is owned by Accor, which acquired FRHI Hotels & Resorts in 2015.

The corporate offices for Swissôtel are located in the Prioria Business Center on the property of Zurich Airport in Kloten, Switzerland, near Zürich.

Corporate history

Swissôtel was founded in 1981 as a joint venture between the Swissair and Nestlé groups, with its headquarters in the Swiss city of Zurich. Initially, hotels were operated in Berne, New York City, Geneva and Zurich. In 1990, the hotel group became a fully owned subsidiary of the Swissair group, and in 1996, its head office moved from Zurich to New York.

In 2001, with the parent airline in the serious financial difficulties due to the events of 9/11 that year in the United States that eventually lead to its demise, Swissôtel was sold to Raffles Holdings Limited, the owner of the famous Raffles Hotel in Singapore. In July 2005, Colony Capital, a private international investment firm, acquired Raffles International Limited, the company that by this stage owned both the Raffles and Swissôtel brands.

In May 2006, Colony Capital, together with Kingdom Hotels International, acquired Fairmont Hotels & Resorts. With the completion of the transaction, the Fairmont and Raffles International portfolios were combined, transforming the companies into a global hotel leader (headquartered in Toronto) called Fairmont Raffles Hotels International, with 120 hotels in 23 countries under three brands – Fairmont, Raffles and Swissôtel. After the transaction, the corporate office of Swissôtel Hotels & Resorts moved back to Zurich, where it was headed by its president, Meinhard Huck, who retired in 2013.

In December 2015, AccorHotels purchased Swissôtel, along with Raffles and Fairmont hotels, in a $2.9 billion deal.

Paolo Guerrero case 

The Swissôtel in Lima, Peru, was involved in the process that led to the sanction of the Peruvian football player Paolo Guerrero. According to the player's defense against FIFA and the Court of Arbitration for Sport, the player was contaminated by having consumed a tea contaminated with coca leaf served in the Swissôtel in Lima during the concentration regime that was fulfilled by the Peruvian Football Federation, prior to a qualifying match 2018 FIFA World Cup.

FIFA imposed Paolo Guerrero a one-year penalty, beginning November 3, 2017, for which he was unable to play the playoff against New Zealand, after which the Appeals Committee reduced the punishment to six months. The player went to the Court of Arbitration for Sport  to request the total acquittal, an instance in which the sentence was extended to 14 months of suspension.

Paolo Guerrero affirmed that the Swissôtel in Lima hindered the obtaining of evidentiary evidence that was required to sustain its case before the Court of Arbitration for Sport:
"The hotel was an important factor that hurt me, that is very clear, when I came here to Peru to find the evidence of how this had been caused, the Swissotel turned its back on me, they did not support me at any time. What I wanted to know was the truth.""They threatened the waiter so he would not talk. At the hotel they did not allow us to talk to him."

The Peruvian citizens in response called for marches against the Swissôtel, criticism and negative comments in social networks like Facebook, Twitter, and TripAdvisor as well as boycotts to not use the services of Swissôtel.

References

External links

Hotels established in 1981
Hotels in Zürich
Hospitality companies of Switzerland
Swissair
Accor
Swiss brands
Hotel chains in Switzerland
Dongcheng District, Beijing